Sándor Tarics (23 September 1913 – 21 May 2016) was a Hungarian water polo player who won a gold medal in the 1936 Summer Olympics.

Biography
Born in Budapest, Tarics was part of the Hungarian team which won the gold medal, pushing Germany into second. He played two matches, and scored two goals. He also won gold medals with the Hungarian team at the 1933, 1935 and 1937 International University Games as well as the unofficial, German-led 1939 International University Games. He was able to escape post-war Soviet-occupied Hungary when his engineering degree earned him a teaching fellowship at an American university. He went on to establish and grow a successful architecture and engineering practice in San Francisco, California.

Scientific merits

Solving a stadium roofing
Solving a stadium roofing problem led to the patent “Stadium Roof, Patent No. 226, 181, Jan. 30, 1973”.

Composite Seismic Isolator

A high-rise project in 1979 led to "Composite Seismic Isolator, Patent No. 5, 461, 835, Oct. 31, 1995" and two other patents. The patents themselves are also witty, but no less keen eye was needed to get them accepted due to the catch-22 in construction.

Incorrectly, many promotional writings refer to this invention as placing buildings on springs. In fact, the first step is to realize that you should not put it on springs, but on the contrary, you should use shock absorbers! Therefore, in this section, contrary to the encyclopedic nature, we do not rely on false sources, but on Sándor Tarics' own personal explanation, because perhaps he knows better what, how and why he did it.

Tarics' earthquake-insulating screeds and their variants are now widely used in medium-rise buildings and highway bridges. They are not suitable for protecting the two gates of the Golden Gate Bridge, but the highways leading to the Golden Gate Bridge and many other highway bridges in earthquake-prone zones have been built on such patties.

He was on a study trip in the United States. In 1943, he obtained a doctorate. In 1948, he emigrated to the USA with the help of a scholarship. Between 1949 and 1951, he became a professor at Fort Wayne University, and from 1951 at the California Institute of Technology. In 1950, he became co-president and then owner of an architectural firm in San Francisco. Later, he was a professor at the University of California, Berkeley. He worked in the UN Commission on Earthquakes.

Tarics attended the 2012 London Olympics as the oldest living Olympic champion and turned 100 in September 2013. Following the death of Attilio Pavesi, Tarics was the oldest living Olympic champion.

Tarics died in San Francisco, United States, on 21 May 2016 at the age of 102.

See also
 Hungary men's Olympic water polo team records and statistics
 List of Olympic champions in men's water polo
 List of Olympic medalists in water polo (men)
 List of centenarians (sportspeople)
 Composite Seismic Isolator, Patent No. 5, 461, 835, Oct. 31, 1995

References

 
 Profile of Sándor Tarics in the San Francisco Gate, August 23, 2008

External links
 

1913 births
2016 deaths
Hungarian male water polo players
Olympic gold medalists for Hungary in water polo
Water polo players at the 1936 Summer Olympics
Hungarian centenarians
Hungarian emigrants to the United States
Medalists at the 1936 Summer Olympics
Men centenarians
Water polo players from Budapest
20th-century Hungarian people